Good Lord was a New Zealand thoroughbred racehorse.

Good Lord may also refer to:
"Good Lord" (song), a 2019 song by Birds of Tokyo
God
Jesus in Christianity (0s BC–30s AD)
Guru Nanak (1469 AD-1539 AD)

See also
Dark Lord (disambiguation)